Jonestown is a town in Coahoma County, Mississippi, United States. Per the 2020 census, the population was 962.

History
The Matagorda Plantation, located north of Jonestown, was established by Colonel D.M. Russell and his wife before the Civil War. Matagorda was named after a special variety of long-staple cotton raised there.

Jonestown was a stop on the Mobile & North Western Railroad, completed from Jonestown to Lula in 1879. Jonestown was incorporated in 1880.

In 1965, John Wing was elected mayor of Jonestown, the first Chinese-American mayor in Mississippi.

Geography
Jonestown is located in northeastern Coahoma County.

Demographics

2020 census

Note: the US Census treats Hispanic/Latino as an ethnic category. This table excludes Latinos from the racial categories and assigns them to a separate category. Hispanics/Latinos can be of any race.

2000 Census
As of the census of 2000, there were 1,701 people, 491 households, and 364 families residing in the town. The population density was 4,315.1 people per square mile (1,684.0/km2). There were 514 housing units at an average density of 1,303.9 per square mile (508.9/km2). The racial makeup of the town was 96.30% African American, 2.59% White, 0.06% Asian, 0.06% Pacific Islander, 0.24% from other races, and 0.76% from two or more races. Hispanic or Latino of any race were 0.47% of the population.

There were 491 households, of which 47.7% had children under the age of 18 living with them, 21.2% were married couples living together, 47.9% had a female householder with no husband present, and 25.7% were non-families. 21.4% of all households were made up of individuals, and 11.0% had someone living alone who was 65 years of age or older. The average household size was 3.46 and the average family size was 4.05.

In the town, the population was spread out, with 44.4% under the age of 18, 11.1% from 18 to 24, 25.0% from 25 to 44, 11.5% from 45 to 64, and 7.9% who were 65 years of age or older. The median age was 21 years. For every 100 females, there were 82.1 males. For every 100 females age 18 and over, there were 65.8 males.

The median income for a household in the town was $17,250 (in 1999 dollars), and the median income for a family was $18,958. Males had a median income of $16,146 versus $19,125 for females. The per capita income for the town was $8,258. About 49.6% of families and 52.1% of the population were below the poverty line, including 57.7% of those under age 18 and 56.3% of those age 65 or over.

Economy
Delta Oil Mill has been producing cottonseed products in Jonestown since 1942.

In a 2000 study published by Mississippi State University, Jonestown was described as a community "plagued by difficult problems." Agriculture no longer supported the town as it once had, and many Jonestown residents were employed outside the community. "The direction of Jonestown has declined because of the loss of its financial independence. Citizens have been forced to seek opportunity outside of their own town. As people become more dependent on other cities, the need to stay in Jonestown diminishes."

Pulitzer Prize-winning poet Charles Simic wrote in 2006:There are towns like Jonestown, Mississippi, that in their shocking poverty make one gasp. Weathered, sagging and unpainted houses, boarded-up windows, others covered with plastic, yards full of dismantled rusty cars, their parts scattered about amid all kinds of other junk and trash, are everywhere. Idle people of all ages lounge on collapsing porches or stand on street corners waiting for something to do. In the countryside with its fertile dark soil, soybeans have become the chief crop, poultry farms are a major business, and there are nine gambling casinos in the next county. All that has increased per capita income in the region, but there was no evidence of it among the blacks I saw.

Education
Jonestown is served by the Coahoma County School District. Residents are served by Jonestown Elementary School and Coahoma County Junior-Senior High School.

Infrastructure
Durocher Service Program is a well-regarded benevolent organization providing social services to Jonestown residents. It is operated by the Sisters of the Holy Names of Jesus and Mary. Catholic Cardinal Avery Dulles described the work of the ministry in Jonestown as "bringing hope to people on the verge of desperation." In 2012, one of the program's nuns survived being beaten and stabbed during a robbery at her Jonestown home.

Notable people
 W.C. Clay, blues musician and feature performer on King Biscuit Time
 Luke Easter, one of the first African-Americans in major-league baseball; first baseman for the Cleveland Indians; murdered and robbed in Euclid, Ohio
 George H. Lane, physician; established a Sickle Cell Center at Deaconess Hospital in Milwaukee
 Oscar Reed, professional football player
 Owen Whitfield, preacher and union organizer
 Seelig Wise (1913-2004), a cotton and soybean farmer in Jonestown and the first Republican member of the Mississippi State Senate since Reconstruction, with service from 1964 to 1968

References

External links
 Jonestown Elementary School
 Photographs by Alison Wright, part of her Third World America series

Towns in Coahoma County, Mississippi
Towns in Mississippi